The National Cooperative Bank is a congressionally chartered cooperative bank in the United States created by the National Consumer Cooperative Bank Act of 1978 (Pub.L. 95-351).  National Cooperative offers banking products and services to cooperatives, their members and social organizations nationwide.

The bank was created to address the financial needs of an underserved market. NCB is an advocate for America's cooperatives and their members, placing special emphasis on serving the needs of communities that are economically challenged.

NCB has focused on community revitalization. The employment of the cooperative model in the development of business contains access to affordable health care and affordable housing.

Capital Impact Partners was the non-profit community development financial institution subsidiary of the NCB.  It became a stand-alone organization in 2014.

References

External links
 

Banks of the United States
Cooperative banks in the United States
Banks established in 1978
American companies established in 1978